Rowan is a city in Wright County, Iowa, United States. The population was 123 at the time of the 2020 census.

Geography
Rowan is located at  (42.740145, -93.551047).

Demographics

2010 census
As of the census of 2010, there were 158 people, 67 households, and 44 families residing in the city. The racial makeup of the city was 100.0% White. Hispanic or Latino of any race were 9.5% of the population.

There were 67 households, of which 20.9% had children under the age of 18 living with them, 47.8% were married couples living together, 10.4% had a female householder with no husband present, 7.5% had a male householder with no wife present, and 34.3% were non-families. 26.9% of all households were made up of individuals, and 12% had someone living alone who was 65 years of age or older. The average household size was 2.36 and the average family size was 2.75.

The median age in the city was 44 years. 19.6% of residents were under the age of 18; 9.4% were between the ages of 18 and 24; 21.5% were from 25 to 44; 26.6% were from 45 to 64; and 22.8% were 65 years of age or older. The gender makeup of the city was 56.3% male and 43.7% female.

2000 census
As of the census of 2000, there were 218 people, 93 households, and 55 families residing in the city. The racial makeup of the city was 92.20% White, 3.21% Native American, 3.67% from other races, and 0.92% from two or more races. Hispanic or Latino of any race were 6.88% of the population.

There were 93 households, out of which 28.0% had children under the age of 18 living with them, 49.5% were married couples living together, 7.5% had a female householder with no husband present, and 39.8% were non-families. 37.6% of all households were made up of individuals, and 28.0% had someone living alone who was 65 years of age or older. The average household size was 2.34 and the average family size was 3.14.

Age spread:  28.9% under the age of 18, 4.1% from 18 to 24, 24.8% from 25 to 44, 17.0% from 45 to 64, and 25.2% who were 65 years of age or older. The median age was 39 years. For every 100 females, there were 91.2 males. For every 100 females age 18 and over, there were 78.2 males.

The median income for a household in the city was $25,000, and the median income for a family was $34,531. Males had a median income of $26,500 versus $18,750 for females. The per capita income for the city was $13,077. About 5.1% of families and 6.3% of the population were below the poverty line, including none of those under the age of eighteen and 12.3% of those 65 or over.

Community
Rowan, located right along Highway 3 in the eastern portion of Wright County, has a lot to offer for a town of 155 people. The Iowa River Players Community Theatre, located in the renovated former school gymnasium, presents 3–4 performances per year and brings people from Belmond, Clarion, Dows, Latimer, Hampton, and other area communities. The new Rowan Community Building on Main Street houses the Rowan Public Library, City Hall, and a Community Center. Rowan's main street also features a playground, fire station, custom wood framing shop, machine and welding business, and a historical museum. NEW Cooperative has a grain elevator in town and a new elevator just east of town, with a feed mill currently under construction. Rowan has one church in town, the United Church of Rowan, which is a yoked church that belongs to both the United Church of Christ Congregational and the United Methodist Church. There is also a church 4 miles west of Rowan at the Highway 3/69 Junction—the Immanuel Missouri-Synod Lutheran Church. Rowan is a small community that offers affordable housing and is a 12-mile commute to either Belmond or Clarion and Interstate 35 is a short 7-mile drive east.

Education
Belmond–Klemme Community School District serves the community.

Rowan Consolidated School District consolidated with Belmond in 1962. Belmond–Klemme formed on July 1, 1994, with the merger of the Belmond and Klemme districts.

Today, the Belmond–Klemme School District has a K–12 enrollment of about 700 students.

References

External links
 City website

Cities in Wright County, Iowa
Cities in Iowa